"Africa" is an 18th-century hymn tune by American choral composer William Billings, who worked in New England.

History
Billings wrote "Africa" some time before 1770 and included it in his first published hymnbook, The New England Psalm Singer.  Later he revised it, publishing a new version in his The Singing Master's Assistant (1778). He made additional revisions, publishing it again in Music in Miniature (1779).  It is the latter two versions that are performed today.

The name of the hymn is, as far as can be determined, completely arbitrary, and reflects a practice of Billings's day to give names specifically to the tunes of songs. Billings also wrote an "Asia" and an "America"; more often, he adopted the names of (arbitrarily chosen) New England towns to label his tunes.

Music
Version of 1778.

Musically, the work is notable for the parallel descending thirds and sixths that shift from part to part.  Some renditions of this hymn (for example, the practice of Sacred Harp singer) follow a practice recommended by Billings, with some male singers on the treble, singing an octave down, and some female singers on the tenor part, singing an octave higher.

Words
The 1770 version of "Africa" was published without lyrics.  Since it readily fits any iambic quatrain written in couplets of eight and six syllables (common meter), singers of this version would certainly have had no trouble finding lyrics to accompany it. Such quatrains are common in hymn lyrics.

For the 1778 and 1779 versions, Billings chose lyrics: the first stanza of Hymn #39 of the first volume of hymns (1709) by the noted English hymnodist Isaac Watts.

Billings altered Watts's "joys" to "joy", although this change is not always observed by singers.  Sometimes the other stanzas by Watts are also sung to the tune of "Africa"; they are as follows:

Reception
"Africa" is a favorite among Billings' works, and is performed frequently on concert programs and in recordings.  It is one of several Billings' hymns included in the Sacred Harp musical tradition. It is widely sung in this context, although a comparatively recent addition to that book.

Books
The hymnbooks in which Billings first published "Africa" are in print today, in scholarly editions edited by Hans Nathan and published by the University Press of Virginia:

The New England Psalm Singer, 
The Singing Master's Assistant and Music in Miniature (in one volume), 

Much of the information above is taken from these scholarly editions.

Notes

External links
Excerpt from a performance by the William Appling Singers
"Africa" as sung by a large assembly of Sacred Harp singers (Minnesota State Sacred Harp Singing Convention)

Hymn tunes
1760s works
Compositions by William Billings